Members of the New South Wales Legislative Assembly  who served in the 27th parliament of New South Wales held their seats from 1925 to 1927. They were elected at the 1925 state election on 30 May 1925. The Speaker was James Dooley.

Under the provisions of the Parliamentary Elections (Casual Vacancies) Act, casual vacancies were filled by the next unsuccessful candidate on the departing member's party list. If an Independent member retired, the Clerk of the Assembly determined who would fill the vacancy based on the departing members voting record in questions of confidence.

See also
First Lang ministry
Results of the 1925 New South Wales state election
Candidates of the 1925 New South Wales state election

References
Citations

Bibliography
Nairn, Bede (1995) Jack Lang the 'Big Fella': Jack Lang and the Australian Labor Party 1891–1949, Melbourne University Press, Melbourne. . 

Members of New South Wales parliaments by term
20th-century Australian politicians